is a passenger railway station in the city of Toride, Ibaraki Prefecture, Japan operated by the private railway company Kantō Railway.

Lines
Yumemino Station is served by the Jōsō Line operating between Toride and Shimodate.

Station layout
The station consists of one island platform, connected by an underpass to the station building. The station is unattended.

Platforms

Adjacent stations

History

The station opened on 12 March 2011.

Passenger statistics
In fiscal 2018, the station was used by an average of 1883 passengers daily (boarding passengers only).

Surrounding area

See also
 List of railway stations in Japan

References

External links

 Kantō Railway station information 

Railway stations in Ibaraki Prefecture
Railway stations in Japan opened in 2011
Toride, Ibaraki